DONA International (formerly Doulas of North America) was founded in 1992 and is the first and largest doula training and certification organization. The current president of the non-profit is Nikia Lawson.

History 
In the 1980s, Dr. Marshall Klaus, Dr. John H. Kennell, Phyllis Klaus, Penny Simkin, and Annie Kennedy first formed a partnership of doulas and medical professionals. Klaus (1927-2017), a neonatologist, and Kennell (1922-2013), a pediatrician, gave credibility to doulas Phyllis Klaus, Simkin, and Kennedy by supporting their work through the research of parent-child bonding in the 1960s at Case Western Reserve University.

Doulas Of North America (DONA) was formally founded in 1992 and the organization was the first of its kind to both train and certify the non-medical birth support of doulas and marked the start of professional doulas on a nationwide basis. Kennedy (who had originally founded the Pacific Association of Labor Support in 1989 in Seattle, WA with Simkin alongside the doula training at Seattle Midwifery School) become  the first president of the organization.

In 2004, the organization re-branded as DONA International.

By 2016, there were 12,000 doulas certified through the organization.

Training and certification 
DONA International offers birth and postpartum doula training and certification. To certify as a birth doula, an in-person workshop is mandatory, along with supplementary text reading, breastfeeding training and childbirth education, clients experience, business training, essay, and references. The in-person workshop is taught by approved trainers who are able to the required coursework which includes emotional support, physical support or comfort measures, communication, interventions, ethics and professional behavior.

Advocacy 
DONA International has five advocacy areas:

 Doula profession promotion and credibility
 Health disparities and inequities
 Insurance payment
 Legislative action
 Research and data collection

References

External links 

DONA International

Childbirth
Women's health